Údarás na Gaeltachta (meaning "Gaeltacht Authority"), abbreviated UnaG, is a regional state agency which is responsible for the economic, social and cultural development of Irish-speaking (Gaeltacht) regions of Ireland. Its stated purpose is to strengthen the Gaeltacht communities, to increase the quality of life of its community members and facilitate the preservation and extension of the Irish language as the principal language of the region. It gives funding to small local businesses that have to compete with foreign companies.

History
It was originally established in 1980 under the Údarás na Gaeltachta Act, 1979, superseding its predecessor Gaeltarra Éireann which had been established in 1957 under the Gaeltacht Industries Act of the same year.

It has a strong role in attracting enterprise into Gaeltacht areas, many of which are isolated and economically disadvantaged. The European Union grant-aid is often provided to indigenous startup companies. They are also involved in the setting up of community co-operatives and employment schemes.

Governance
Údarás na Gaeltachta has a 12-member board. In accordance with the Údarás na Gaeltachta Act, 1979, as amended by the Gaeltacht Act 2012, the Minister with responsibility for the Gaeltacht appoints the board members for a period not exceeding five years, five of these on the nomination of county councils from counties which include Gaeltacht areas.

The head office of Údarás na Gaeltachta is in Furbo, County Galway, with regional offices in Derrybeg, County Donegal, Belmullet County Mayo, Dingle, County Kerry and Ballymakeera, County Cork. The current chairperson is Anna Ní Ghallachair from Arranmore, County Donegal.

Constituencies
From 1979 to 2012, some members of the board were elected by popular vote of Gaeltacht residents. These single transferable vote constituencies were as follows:

See also
Coiste Cearta Síbialta na Gaeilge
Gaeltacht
IDA Ireland
Gaeltacht Act 2012
Bailte Seirbhísí Gaeltachta
Líonraí Gaeilge
CONCOS
Amharclann Ghaoth Dobhair
Irish language

References

External links
Údarás na Gaeltachta
 Údarás na Gaeltachta on YouTube

Government agencies established in 1980
Government agencies of the Republic of Ireland
1980 establishments in Ireland
Irish culture
Gaelic culture
Irish language organisations
Economy of the Republic of Ireland
Celtic language advocacy organizations
Department of Tourism, Culture, Arts, Gaeltacht, Sport and Media
Seanad nominating bodies